Monique Jeanblanc-Picqué (born 1947) is a French mathematician known for her work in mathematical finance; other topics in her research have included control theory and probability theory. She is a professor emerita at the University of Évry Val d'Essonne.

Education and career
Jeanblanc was a student at the Ecole Normale Supérieure de Cachan from 1966 to 1969, when she took a teaching position there. In 1992 she moved to the University of Évry.

Books
Jeanblanc is the author or coauthor of the books including
Enlargement of Filtration with Finance in View (with Anna Aksamit, Springer, 2017)
Mathematical Methods for Financial Markets (with Marc Yor and Marc Chesney, Springer, 2009)
Marchés financiers en temps continu: valorisation et équilibre (with Rose-Anne Dana, Economica, 1998), translated into English as Financial Markets in Continuous Time (Springer, 2003)

Recognition
In 2009, Jeanblanc was made a chevalier in the Legion of Honour.

References

External links
Home page

1947 births
Living people
French mathematicians
French women mathematicians
Chevaliers of the Légion d'honneur